Vincent Seatelli (born 26 November 1971) is a French former professional footballer who played as a striker.

See also
Football in France

References

External links
 

1971 births
Living people
French footballers
Association football defenders
FC Martigues players
Olympique Alès players
FC Rouen players
Ligue 1 players
Ligue 2 players